Nowy Wiśnicz  is a small town in Bochnia County, Lesser Poland Voivodeship, Poland, with 2,728 inhabitants (2019).

Former structures
The Carmelite Church in Nowy Wiśnicz was established by Stanisław Lubomirski, voivode of Kraków to commemorate the victory over the Turks in the Battle of Khotyn (1621). It was constructed according to design by Matteo Trapola between 1631 and 1635. The interior was embellished with profuse early baroque stucco decorations by Giovanni Battista Falconi, frescoes by Mathäus Ingermann of Rome, 8 marble altars with oil paintings by Ingermann and probably by José de Ribera (the founder was a passionate collector of European art). Between 1942 and 1944 the interior was devastated by the Germans and eventually the church had been demolished.

See also
 Eugeniusz Molski, a well-known sculptor from Nowy Wiśnicz

References

External links

 http://nowywisnicz.pl Official town webpage] 
 Jewish Community in Nowy Wiśnicz on Virtual Shtetl

Cities and towns in Lesser Poland Voivodeship
Bochnia County
Kraków Voivodeship (14th century – 1795)
Kingdom of Galicia and Lodomeria
Kraków Voivodeship (1919–1939)